Candida Gertler (born 1966/1967)  is a British/German art collector, philanthropist, and former journalist.

Early life
She was born in Frankfurt am Main, Germany, to Romanian Jewish immigrant parents. She studied journalism and law.

Career
In 2003 Gertler and Yana Peel founded the Outset Contemporary Art Fund.

In June 2015, she was given an OBE "for services to Contemporary Visual Arts and Arts Philanthropy".

She is a member of the Tate International Council.

Personal life
She is married to Zak Gertler. They are Jewish, and have two children.

He has been called "one of London's leading property developers". In 2009, Zak Gertler and family had an estimated net worth of £150 million, down from £250 million in 2008. "The Gertlers developed offices in Germany, moving into the London market in the 1990s."

References

Living people
British art collectors
Women art collectors
1960s births
People from Frankfurt
Officers of the Order of the British Empire
20th-century German Jews
German expatriates in the United Kingdom
German people of Romanian descent
German philanthropists
German women philanthropists